Peabody Public Schools is a public school district on the North Shore of Massachusetts.  It includes 8 elementary schools, 1 middle school, and 1 high school.

Current Schools in the District

Elementary schools
 Captain Samuel Brown School — 150 Lynn Street
 John E. Burke School — 127 Birch Street
 Thomas Carroll School — 60 Northend Street
 Center Elementary School — 18 Irving Street
 John E. McCarthy Memorial School — 76 Lake Street
 South Memorial School — 16 Maple Street Extension
 William A. Welch Sr. Elementary School — 50 Swampscott Avenue
 West Memorial Elementary School — 15 Bow Street

Junior high schools
 J. Henry Higgins Middle School — 85 Perkins Street

Secondary schools
 Peabody Veterans Memorial High School — 485 Lowell Street
 Peabody Community High School — 485 Lowell Street; D House

Former Schools in the District
Kiley Brothers Memorial Elementary School— 21 Johnson Street
Farnsworth Elementary School 103 Central Street
John F. Kennedy Junior High School 83 Pine Street

References

External links
 

School districts in Massachusetts
Education in Essex County, Massachusetts